El Rancho High School is a public high school located in the city of Pico Rivera, California, United States.  It is a part of the El Rancho Unified School District.

History
El Rancho High School opened its doors in September 1952. Whittier High School provided many of the original El Rancho students, and the Whittier Union District administered the new school until 1962 when the El Rancho Unified School District was developed.

The school opened before the municipal incorporation of Pico Rivera, within the unincorporated community of Rivera.

The school colors are Blue and Gray, representing the colors of the Union and Confederate soldiers of the American Civil War. The two neighboring communities were Pico and Rivera: in symbolic terms, the North and the South.  Ultimately the school brought students from the two communities together.  El Rancho, Spanish for The Ranch, provided the student body and community with the nickname, The Ranch.

The land for the school was donated by the community. There were restrictions on that donation, including that all new construction would match the existing structures. After the initial construction, residents were told that if they wanted a pool on campus, the community would have to pay for it.

The football stadium slogan is "You haven't been hit until you've been hit by The Ranch", which became well known throughout the Southland during the El Rancho powerhouse years of the 1960s.

In 2011, The El Rancho School Board voted to name the Football field at El Rancho 'Don Memorial Stadium'- "Ernie Johnson Field" in honor of his numerous and remarkable contributions and achievements during his tenure of head football coach at El Rancho. A banquet in the El Rancho Gymnasium attended by more than 400 past players, coaches was held on August 28, 2011. The City of Pico Rivera also declared that day as "Ernie Johnson Day". Official field dedication took place on September 23, 2011, at El Rancho's homecoming football game.

No seniors were present during the first year of school; the first graduating class was 1954.

Reflecting the local demographics, the school's initial student body was primarily white, non-Hispanic, but with a notable percentage of Hispanic students.

When El Rancho was in the process of opening, the students who were planning to attend the school attended assemblies to decide their mascot. The Don was adopted as the school's mascot by a vote of the students.  Other mascot candidates included the Swallows, the Rocketeers, and Grizzlies.

In 1990, the school was used for the film Zapped Again!.

Sports 
El Rancho High School football team during the 1960s established themselves as one of the most respected high school football programs in California.  The Dons were led by head coach Ernie Johnson, who coached from 1956 to 1968.  In 1966, the Dons were awarded the National Championship and California State Championship when they beat Anaheim High School by a score of 35–14, in the Championship game. [For detailed local news coverage of the National Championship 1966 season, see Ruben Quintero's My Mother's Scrapbook: El Rancho Dons Football--1966 National Champions  (2020).] Coach Johnson directed El Rancho High to nine League Championships in 1959, 1961, 1962, 1963, 1964, 1965, 1966, 1967, 1968. Three CIF Championships in 1960, 1966 1968, were CIF Runners-up in 1960 and 1963 and a National High School Football Championship in 1966.  Coach Johnson ended his coaching tenure in 1968 with a 108-31-5 record.
El Rancho last won a league championship in 2014 under head coach Vinnie Lopez. El Rancho's last CIF Semifinals appearance was in 2018 losing to Eisenhower High School. El Rancho last made it to the CIF Championship game in 1988 losing to Los Altos high school 12–0.
El Rancho football's crosstown rivals are the Montebello Oilers, Pioneer Titans, Whittier Cardinals, and Santa Fe Chiefs.

During the season of 1976-’77, El Rancho soccer player Joel Daniel (born Duane Joel Daniel) set two CIF-Southern Section records. As a goalkeeper, Daniel posted 417 saves in one season, as well as 39 saves in one game in a 1-0 loss to Alhambra High School on February 15, 1977. Both marks currently hold the Number 1 position in the CIF-SS All-Time Record Book. 
According to the NFHS (National Federation of State High School Associations), Daniel's 417 saves in one season ranks at Number 1 among all California High Schools, and at Number 5 among all National High School performances. While accumulating the 417 saves, Daniel gave up a total of 49 goals in a 19 game season; an average of less than 2.6 goals per-game, with an overall average of 21.9 saves per game.  Although his 39 saves in one game ranks at only Number 11 in the nation, Daniel’s saves-per-goal-allowed was 39.0, while those ranked in the top ten nationally were significantly lower -from the nearest- at 8.2 saves-per-goal-allowed, down to 1.6 saves-per-goal-allowed.

Teen court
El Rancho Teen Court program is a juvenile diversion and prevention program in Pico Rivera, California.  The program serves youths throughout Los Angeles County.  Students from El Rancho High School serve as jurors in the early intervention program, judging peers selected by the Los Angeles County Probation Department.  The Teen Court program works in conjunction with the El Rancho Unified School District.

The Presiding Judges are Olivia Rosales and James Horan from the Superior Court of Los Angeles County.   Blanca Pacheco esq. is the El Rancho Teen Court's Court Attorney, who assists the jury in understanding the charges against the defendant and proctors the jury deliberations. Raul Elias serves as the El Rancho Teen Court's Judicial officer, which entails supervision of Teen Court participants’ attendance in order to curve extracurricular Teen Court participation negatively affecting academic progress. Dr. Rebecca Marin is the Court's Psychologist and Raul Elias also serves as the Teen Court Coordinator for El Rancho high School, whose duties include overall supervision of the Teen Court Program and maintenance of a schedule for Teen Court sessions and Court tutorials with assistance from Alexis Hernandez.

Court is held at the City of Pico Rivera City Hall Council Chambers.

El Rancho High School Teen Court is a collaboration between the El Rancho Unified School District and the City of Pico Rivera organized by Raul Elias.

Notable alumni
Mark Jeffrey Bailey, NFL Kansas City Chiefs
Larry Anderson, former Major League Baseball pitcher
Don Gregorio Antón, artist, educator
Rich Camarillo, NFL punter
Tom Egan, major league catcher
Randy Flores, director of scouting for the St. Louis Cardinals, major league left-handed relief pitcher and 2006 World Series champion.
Ron Flores, major league left-handed relief pitcher for the Oakland Athletics
Jeanette Jurado, actress, singer
Mickey Klutts (1954– ), Major League Baseball player from 1976 to 1983 for the New York Yankees, Oakland Athletics and Toronto Blue Jays
Bill Nelsen, quarterback with the Pittsburgh Steelers and Cleveland Browns
Cesar Ramos, Major League Baseball pitcher
Scott Reid, Major League Baseball outfielder with the Philadelphia Phillies
Cristian Roldan, current member of Major League Soccer team Seattle Sounders FC, and 2 time MLS Cup winner (2016, 2019)
 Controversial former councilmember Gregory Salcido
Alex Roldan, soccer player for the Seattle Sounders

References

External links
 The Don Page, El Rancho High School
 https://twitter.com/ElRanchoHS 
 School overview at greatschools.net

High schools in Los Angeles County, California
Public high schools in California
Pico Rivera, California
1952 establishments in California
Educational institutions established in 1952